Catholicon may refer to:

 Catholicon, the conventual church at the centre of an abbey
 Katholikon, the primary church in an Orthodox or Eastern Catholic monastery
 Catholicon (Mor Yakub), part of the Holy Liturgy of Mor Yakub of the Syriac Orthodox Church
 Catholicon (1286), book written in 1286 by Johannes de Balbis of Genoa (Summa grammaticalis quae vocatur Catholicon)
 Catholicon (trilingual dictionary), Breton–Latin–French dictionary written in 1464 by Jehan Lagadeuc and printed in 1499
 Catholicon (electuary), an alleged all-purpose cure (panacea) used in pre-modern medicine